Joseph (Joe) Daily Cormier (born May 3, 1963) is a former American football linebacker and tight end for the Minnesota Vikings and Los Angeles Raiders of the National Football League (NFL).

Early life

Cormier was born in Los Angeles, California. He attended high school at Junípero Serra High School (Gardena, California), where he excelled in football, basketball, and track and field. Cormier currently serves as Serra's Alumni Relations and Development Director.

USC

Heavily recruited out of high school, Cormier starred as a three-year letterman for the University of Southern California Trojans football team. In 1984, Cormier caught a touchdown pass during the Trojans' Rose Bowl victory against the Ohio State Buckeyes. In the 1985 season, he caught a team-leading 44 receptions for the Trojans, played in the Aloha Bowl, and was named an All-Pac-10 Selection.

NFL

Cormier was selected in the 10th Round of the 1985 Draft by the Minnesota Vikings and played in the 1987-1990 seasons for the Los Angeles Raiders.

References

1963 births
American football linebackers
Minnesota Vikings players
Living people
USC Trojans football players
Players of American football from Los Angeles
National Football League replacement players
Junípero Serra High School (Gardena, California) alumni